Herviella mietta is a species of sea slug, an aeolid nudibranch, a marine gastropod mollusc in the family Facelinidae.

Distribution
This species was described from Eniwetok Atoll. It has been reported from Hawaii and Japan.

References

Facelinidae
Gastropods described in 1965